Karim Alami was the defending champion, but lost in the quarter-finals to Alberto Berasategui.

Alberto Berasategui won the title by defeating Dominik Hrbatý 6–4, 6–2 in the final.

Seeds

Draw

Finals

Top half

Bottom half

References

External links
 Official results archive (ATP)
 Official results archive (ITF)

Campionati Internazionali di Sicilia
1997 ATP Tour
Camp